The Quinnipiac Bobcats men's soccer program represents the Quinnipiac University in all NCAA Division I men's college soccer competitions. Founded in 1962, the Bobcats compete in the Metro Atlantic Athletic Conference. The Bobcats are coached by Eric Da Costa, who has coached the program since 2005. The Bobcats plays their home matches at Quinnipiac Soccer Stadium, on the QU campus.

NCAA tournament results 
 2013: L 1-2 vs. UConn
 2022: L 2-3 2OT vs. Vermont

References

External links
 

 
1962 establishments in Connecticut
Association football clubs established in 1962